Joseph Wirihana Royal (born 31 May 1985 in Rotorua, New Zealand) is a New Zealand rugby union player. He plays in the hooker (and occasionally prop) position for provincial side Counties Manukau Steelers and for New Zealand's Māori international side the Māori All Blacks. Royal has previously played for North Harbour in 2009 before heading to Bay of Plenty Rugby in 2013 and spending 4 seasons with the Bay Steamers. After moving back home to Auckland in 2017 as an injury replacement for the Blues and is now in his third season with the Counties Manukau Steelers in the Mitre 10 Cup.

References

1985 births
New Zealand rugby union players
New Zealand Māori rugby union players
Māori All Blacks players
Bay of Plenty rugby union players
North Harbour rugby union players
Rugby union hookers
Rugby union players from Rotorua
Living people
Counties Manukau rugby union players
Auckland rugby union players
Moana Pasifika players